Iran first participated at the Asian Games in 1951, and has sent athletes to compete in every Asian Games since then, except for 1954, 1962 and 1978.

The National Olympic Committee for Iran is the National Olympic Committee of the Islamic Republic of Iran, and was founded in 1947.

Medals by games

Asian Games

Asian Winter Games

Asian Indoor and Martial Arts Games

Asian Beach Games

Asian Youth Games

Medals by sport

Asian Games

Asian Winter Games

Asian Indoor and Martial Arts Games

Asian Beach Games

Asian Youth Games

West Asian Games

Multiple Asian Games gold medalists

This is a list of multiple Asian Games gold medalists for Iran, listing people who have won more than two gold medals.

Athletes in bold are still active.

List of flag bearers

References

External links
Official website of the Iran Olympic Committee